Leukoedema is a blue, grey or white appearance of mucosae, particularly the buccal mucosa (the inside of the cheeks); it may also occur on the mucosa of the larynx or vagina. It is a harmless and very common condition. Because it is so common, it has been argued that it may in fact represent a variation of the normal appearance rather than a disease, but empirical evidence suggests that leukoedema is an acquired condition caused by local irritation. It is found more commonly in black skinned people and tobacco users. The term is derived from the Greek words λευκός leukós, "white" and οἴδημα oídēma, "swelling".

Signs and symptoms
There is a diffuse, gray-white, milky opalescent appearance of the mucosa which usually occurs bilaterally on the buccal mucosa. Less often, the labial mucosa, the palate or the floor of mouth may be affected. The surface of the area is folded, creating a wrinkled, white streaked lesion. Apart from the appearance, the lesion is entirely asymptomatic.

Causes
The cause is unknown, but it is thought to be caused by intracellular edema of the superficial epithelial cells coupled with retention of superficial parakeratin.  Although leukoedema is thought to be a developmental condition, it may be more common and more pronounced in smokers, and becomes less noticeable when smoking is stopped. Smoking cannabis is known to be linked to this condition. It may also develop in areas subjected to repeat subclinical irritation, caused by low grade irritants such as spices, oral debris or tobacco.

Diagnosis
Leukoedema lesions disappear when the mucosa is stretched, which helps to differentiate it from other white lesions in the mouth. The differential diagnosis is with leukoplakia, oral candidiasis, oral lichen planus, white sponge nevus, morsicatio buccarum, hereditary benign intraepithelial dyskeratosis and dyskeratosis congenita. Tissue biopsy is not indicated, but when taken, the histologic appearance is one of increased epithelial thickness, broadening and elongation of the rete ridges, parakeratosis and intracellular edema of the spinous layer. The cells of the spinous layer are vacuolated, large and possess pyknotic nuclei. The superficial squamous cells have a clear, seemingly empty cytoplasm but it has not been shown that there is an increase in intracellular water, possibly making the term edema misleading. The histologic appearance is thought to be caused by water within the cells of the spinous layer causing the light to reflect back as whitish. The diagnosis is usually made based on the clinical appearance alone, but oral exfoliative cytology has been used as a diagnostic aid.

Treatment and prognosis
Leukoedema is a harmless condition, and no treatment is indicated. People may be alarmed by the appearance and benefit from reassurance.

Epidemiology
Leukoedema is common. It occurs in about 70-90% of dark skinned adults and about 50% of dark skinned children. The prevalence in white skinned people is considerably less, but reports range from less than 10% to more than 90%, probably varying depending upon the population studied, and the methods used in the study, e.g. examination conditions and the diagnostic criteria. The ethnic variation may be explained by genetic factors or simply because dark skinned people have greater amount of melanin in the mucosa, making it appear darker (termed racial or physiologic pigmentation). This darker mucosa may make the edematous changes more noticeable, whereas in the mucosa of people with lighter skin types leukoedema gives a milder presentation.

History
Leukoedema was once thought to be a precursor lesion to leukoplakia, and was not believed to occur in children, but both of these views are now disproved.

References

External links 

Oral mucosal pathology